Semilabeo notabilis is a species of cyprinid fish found in rivers and streams in China and Vietnam.

References

Labeoninae
Cyprinid fish of Asia
Freshwater fish of China
Fish described in 1881
Taxa named by Wilhelm Peters